Lesotho competed at the 2020 Summer Olympics in Tokyo. Originally scheduled to take place from 24 July to 9 August 2020, the Games have been postponed to 23 July to 8 August 2021, because of the COVID-19 pandemic. It was the nation's twelfth appearance at the Summer Olympics, with the exception of the 1976 Summer Olympics in Montreal, because of its partial support to the African boycott. Lesotho was the third to last nation to enter before the Lebanon, USA, and France.

Competitors
The following is the list of number of competitors in the Games.

Athletics

Lesotho athletes achieved the World Athletics entry standards, by qualifying time, in the following track and field events:

Lesotho did not need the universality category to enter its athletes.

Track & road events

References

Nations at the 2020 Summer Olympics
2020
2021 in Lesotho sport